The American soles are a family (Achiridae) of flatfish occurring in both freshwater and marine environments of the Americas.  The family includes about 35 species in seven genera.  These are closely related to the soles (Soleidae), and have been classified as a subfamily of it, but achirids have a number of distinct characteristics.

Eyes are on the right side, and the eyed-side lower lip has a distinctive fleshy rim. The dorsal and anal fins are usually separate from the caudal fin.  The pectoral fins are small or nonexistent. They are fairly small; only Achirus achirus is known to surpass  in length.

See also
List of fish common names
List of fish families

References

 
Taxa named by Constantine Samuel Rafinesque